Jesus College Boat Club (often abbreviated to JCBC) is the rowing club for members of Jesus College, Cambridge.

It is the most successful Cambridge college boat club, holding the most headships between both sides of the club in both the May bumps and the Lent bumps. It has also had numerous successes at other races (such as Henley Royal Regatta) and notable alumni, such as Steve Fairbairn.

Jesus men have been head of the Lent Bumps on 39 occasions (finishing Head on 159 days) and head of the May Bumps on 24 occasions (finishing Head on 98 days) - more than any other boat club, although Jesus men have not been head in either event since 1974. Jesus also held the headship of the early races (before the Lent and May bumps became separate events) for 11 consecutive years between 1875 and 1886 - a feat which has never been equalled.

Jesus Women have been head of the Lent Bumps on 5 occasions, and again head of the May bumps on 5 occasions, ranking themselves very highly amongst the Cambridge colleges. In recent years they have been very successful, being head of the Lents 2016–present and head of the Mays in 2005, 2007 and 2017–present.

Jesus also run the Fairbairn Cup, the biggest race on the Cam (other than bumps), and is named after the alumnus Steve Fairbairn.

History
The club appeared in the first six-oared bumps race in 1827 but performed indifferently. During the early years it rose on occasion to be second and achieved Head of the River in 1841, but remained a minor force until the late 1860s. By 1875 it held Headship again and continued to for eleven years (until 1886) - a record not since equalled. In this time they refurbished the boathouse including the addition of a weathervane and, some years later, a clock tower. Both of which were transferred to the current boathouse.  After this period the club's success declined with Trinity Hall Boat Club and Trinity having an almost monopoly of the Headship, until Jesus recovered it in 1909 and 1912-14.

During the inter-war years the club was coached by Steve Fairbairn and held Headship on twelve occasions in the Lents and occupied a top three position for the entire period.

In the women's bumps, Jesus fielded crews in the 1980s, and took the headship of the Lent Bumps in 1985, 1986, 1987, and 2016–2018, and headship of the May Bumps in 1988, 1993, 1994, 2005, 2007, 2017, and 2018.

Performances at Henley  Royal Regatta

JCBC are also one of the historically successful Cambridge colleges at the Henley Royal Regatta, winning the Grand Challenge Cup, the most prestigious event at the regatta, on 3 occasions; 1879, 1885 and in 1947. Jesus also won the Ladies' Challenge Plate on 13 occasions between 1872 and 1958, the Visitors' Challenge Cup on 5 occasions between 1877 and 1936, the Wyfold Challenge Cup on 2 occasions (1882 and 1921), the Stewards' Challenge Cup in 1879 and the Thames Challenge Cup in 1892. Silver Goblets has been won by Humphrey Playford and John Campbell in 1921 and Thomas Cree and David Burnford in 1935. Jesus therefore have a grand total of 25 Henley wins, although the club has not managed an event win since 1958.

Events

JCBC runs two events of note.  The first is the Fairbairn Cup Races, named after the famous Jesus oarsman and Coach who began the event in the 1920s, Steve Fairbairn. In 1929 Fairbairn donated a cup and the races have continued ever since in their current form, a long distance headrace. Historically, this is raced on the Thursday and Friday after the end of Michaelmas term, Thursday being the novice races and Friday being the senior races. The course has changed over years due to closures for bridge repairs and extreme weather conditions, but in 1990 the start line was made to be Jesus Boathouse Flagpole with the finish at the Little Bridge, some 4.3 km downstream (although the novices race a shorter race, finishing at the railings).  The Fairbairn Cup title is awarded to the fastest finishing college men's eight (the cup itself is now again presented, having been lost for a period but found again in 2015).  There are also divisions for fours (3.4 km) and novice eights (2.7 km). The race is also entered by other local clubs and university crews, notably the Cambridge University Lightweight Rowing Club (CULRC) normally enters, but recent years have also seen entries from the Oxford University Lightweight Rowing Club (OULRC) and occasionally the Cambridge University Boat Club (CUBC) itself.

JCBC has also run the Henley Spare Pairs Race on the day before Henley Royal Regatta.  This event runs from the barrier to the regatta finish and is open to spare pairs of registered regatta entries.

Honours

Henley Royal Regatta

1 This is now a club-only event.

See also
Cambridge University Combined Boat Clubs
University rowing (UK)

References

External links
Jesus College Boat Club

Rowing clubs of the University of Cambridge
Boat
Sports clubs established in 1827
1827 establishments in England
Rowing clubs in Cambridgeshire
Rowing clubs in England
Rowing clubs of the River Cam